Sergio Duvan Córdova Lezama (born 9 August 1997), known as Sergio Córdova, is a Venezuelan professional footballer who plays as a forward for Major League Soccer club Vancouver Whitecaps FC. He also represents the Venezuela national team.

Córdova is an academy graduate of Venezuelan side Caracas and scored on his professional debut in 2015. He spent two and a half season's in the club's first team, scoring five goals in 38 appearances, before signing for Augsburg in 2017. Internationally, he represented Venezuela at U20 level and featured for the nation at the South American Youth Football Championship and U-20 World Cup in 2017, winning the Goal of the Tournament award at the latter competition. Later that year, he made his debut for the senior side.

Club career

Caracas
Having previously represented the club at youth level following his arrival in 2013, Córdova made a goal scoring debut for Caracas on 12 July 2015, starting and scoring the opening goal in a 4–0 league victory over Tucanes. He repeated the feat in his Copa Venezuela debut the following month when he broke the deadlock in the 78th minute of a 3–0 win over second division side Petroleros de Anzoátegui. On 31 October, he became the youngest ever player to score a Primera División brace for the club when he scored twice in a 3–1 win over Metropolitanos. He ended his debut season having amassed 13 appearances across all competitions with a return of four goals.

In the following year's campaign, Córdova was marred by injury and had to undergo surgery after breaking the fifth metatarsal in his left foot. Despite the injury, he managed to make 20 appearances as Caracas ended fourth in the Venezuelan Primera División, thereby qualifying for the 2017 Copa Sudamericana. He made only four more appearances for the club, taking his overall tally to 38 with a return of five goals, before being signed by FC Augsburg following his impressive form with Venezuela at the FIFA U-20 World Cup.

FC Augsburg
On the evening of 4 July 2017, Córdova completed a transfer to German Bundesliga side Augsburg for a reported fee of €1m, signing a five-year contract with the club. He made his debut on 13 August, coming on as a second–half substitute for fellow debutante Marcel Heller in a 2–0 DFB Pokal loss to third division side Magdeburg. He scored his first goal for the club on 26 August, netting an 89th-minute equalizer from an assist by Heller in a 2–2 draw with Borussia Mönchengladbach. In October, whilst on international duty with Venezuela, Córdova suffered a fractured ankle and torn ligaments which him ruled out for part of the Hinrunde. He made his first Bundesliga start for the club the following year, starting in a 1–0 win over Hamburg on 13 January.

Loan to Arminia Bielefeld 
On 17 August 2020, he signed a five-year contract extension with Augsburg before joining newly-promoted Bundesliga side Arminia Bielefeld on a season-long loan.

Loan to Real Salt Lake 
On 3 February 2022, it was announced Córdova had joined Major League Soccer side Real Salt Lake on a season-long loan.

Vancouver Whitecaps 
On 20 February 2023, Córdova returned to Major League Soccer, signing as a designated player with Canadian side Vancouver Whitecaps FC on a 3-year deal.

International career

Venezuela national youth teams

Córdova has represented Venezuela at U20 level and featured at the 2016 Copa de los Andes tournament held in Peru. He scored twice in a 5–1 win over Paraguay which saw Venezuela claim the gold medal, and was named Player of the Tournament, with teammate Ronaldo Peña claiming the top goalscorer award. In February 2017, Córdova took part in the U20 Campeonato Sudamericano with the Venezuela squad. He scored once during the course of the tournament, in a 4–2 win over Ecuador, as Venezuela qualified for the 2017 FIFA U-20 World Cup in South Korea by securing a third-place finish.

The World Cup took place in May the same year and he opened his account with the second goal in a 2–0 win over Germany in the tournament's opening match. Three days later, he added two goals to his tally when he netted a brace in a 7–0 victory over Vanuatu which saw Venezuela become the first team to qualify for the knockout stages of the competition. Córdova scored again in a 1–0 win over Mexico on 26 May which helped Venezuela progress from their group without losing or conceding. His four goals saw him end as the tournament's joint-second top goal scorer alongside Fashion Sakala, Dominic Solanke, Jean-Kévin Augustin and Joshua Sargent, and one behind Golden Boot winner Riccardo Orsolini, as Venezuela were ultimately beaten by England in the final. Córdova's goal against Mexico in the group stages was also voted Goal of the Tournament.

Venezuela senior national team
Córdova received his first call-up to the senior side on 25 August 2017 when he was named in Rafael Dudamel's squad for World Cup qualifiers against Colombia and Argentina. He made his debut on 31 August against the former, starting in a 0–0 draw before registering his first senior assist in a 1–1 draw with the latter on 5 September.

Personal life
Córdova is a practicing Christian and, during a 2018 interview, revealed that his faith in God had helped him overcome the early challenges he faced with the language and cold weather during his time in Germany.

Career statistics

Club

International

Honours 

Venezuela U20
 U-20 Copa de los Andes: 2016
FIFA U-20 World Cup runner-up: 2017
South American Youth Football Championship third place: 2017

Individual
 2016 Copa de los Andes: Player of the Tournament
FIFA U-20 World Cup 2017 Goal of the Tournament: 1–0 (1–0) vs. Mexico

Records
 Youngest player to score a Primera División brace (with Caracas FC): 18 years, 2 months and 22 days

References 

1997 births
Living people
People from Calabozo
Venezuelan Christians
Venezuelan footballers
Venezuelan expatriate footballers
Venezuelan expatriate sportspeople in Germany
Venezuelan expatriate sportspeople in the United States
Expatriate footballers in Germany
Expatriate soccer players in the United States
Venezuela international footballers
Venezuela under-20 international footballers
Association football forwards
Venezuelan Primera División players
Bundesliga players
Caracas FC players
FC Augsburg players
Arminia Bielefeld players
Real Salt Lake players
Vancouver Whitecaps FC players
2021 Copa América players
Major League Soccer players
Designated Players (MLS)